Evening Shade is a census-designated place (CDP) in Sequoyah County, Oklahoma, United States. It is part of the Fort Smith, Arkansas-Oklahoma Metropolitan Statistical Area. The population was 359 at the 2010 census.

Geography
Evening Shade is located at  (35.621874, -94.925036).

Demographics

As of the 2010 United States Census, there were 359 people living in Evening Shade. There were 295 housing units at an average density of 20.0/sq mi (7.7/km2). The racial makeup of the CDP was 60.09% White, 26.76% Native American, 0.23% Pacific Islander, and 12.93% from two or more races.

There were 192 households, out of which 21.4% had children under the age of 18 living with them, 56.3% were married couples living together, 7.3% had a female householder with no husband present, and 31.8% were non-families. 26.0% of all households were made up of individuals, and 10.4% had someone living alone who was 65 years of age or older. The average household size was 2.30 and the average family size was 2.76.

In the CDP, the population was spread out, with 20.9% under the age of 18, 7.3% from 18 to 24, 24.7% from 25 to 44, 29.9% from 45 to 64, and 17.2% who were 65 years of age or older. The median age was 42 years. For every 100 females, there were 123.9 males. For every 100 females age 18 and over, there were 116.8 males.

The median income for a household in the CDP was $19,688, and the median income for a family was $29,706. Males had a median income of $31,563 versus $18,750 for females. The per capita income for the CDP was $11,672. About 24.7% of families and 35.3% of the population were below the poverty line, including 44.4% of those under age 18 and 16.1% of those age 65 or over.

References

Census-designated places in Sequoyah County, Oklahoma
Census-designated places in Oklahoma
Fort Smith metropolitan area